Brindaban Chandra's Math, or Brindaban Chandra Math, is a complex of 17th–18th century temples at Guptipara in Hooghly district in the Indian state of West Bengal.

Geography

Location
Guptipara is 74.6 km from Howrah station on the Howrah-Katwa line.

Those travelling by road from Kolkata can get on to State Highway 6 from somewhere suitable in Howrah district, and travel to Guptipara via Jirat.

Note: The map presents some of the notable locations in the subdivision (partly). All places marked in the map are linked in the larger full-screen map.

The temples
Arranged in a quadrangle, enclosed within a high wall in the Brindaban Chandra Math, are the four temples dedicated to Chaitanyadev (Chaitanya-Nityananda), Brindabanchandra (Radha-Krishna and Jagannath), Ramchandra (Rama, Sita, Lakshmana and Hanuman) and Krishnachandra (Radha-Krishna).

According to David McCutchion, the jor-bangla temple  of Chaitanya in the Brindaban Chandra Math is the earliest Bangla-style  temple still standing. It was built during the reign of Akbar (1542–1605). The at-chala Brindabanchndra temple was built in 1801. The eka-ratna Ramchandra temple was built in the 17th century. The last temple has a rich terracotta façade.

The Bridaban Chandra Math complex at Guptipara is an ASI listed monument.

Brindaban Chandra’s Math picture gallery

References

Hindu temples in West Bengal
Monuments of National Importance in West Bengal